Naseer Pur Kalan (نصير پور کلاں) is a village in Sargodha,  in the Punjab province of Pakistan. It is the biggest village in the tehsil of Kot Momin by area. It also is the one of union council of Kot Momin.

Villages in Sargodha District